Kate Deegan (born 14 September 1996) is an Australian rules footballer who last played for the Brisbane Lions in the AFL Women's.

Early life
Deegan was born in 1996. She was playing for Coorparoo when she was drafted. She has a soccer background, and has played for Annerley in the Brisbane Women's Premier League.

AFLW career
She made her debut in the Lions' round 4 game against  at the South Pine Sports Complex on 25 February 2017.

Deegan was delisted by Brisbane at the end of the 2017 season.

References

External links

1996 births
Living people
Sportswomen from Queensland
Australian rules footballers from Queensland
Brisbane Lions (AFLW) players